Laila Gohar (born 1988) is an internationally recognised artist who works with food as her creative medium.

Born in Egypt, she has lived and worked  in the US for the last decade. Laila’s work has been shown in museums and galleries all over the world. She is also known for her high profile collaborations, and has become a go-to person for fashion, design, gastronomic, and luxury partners who are interested in engaging new audiences using food and visual storytelling. 

Her eye for curation, and ability to create content that captures the zeitgeist has amassed her a loyal following of 260k followers on Instagram.

Beyond this, her work has evolved into product design, launching the eponymous label Gohar World alongside her sister Nadia Gohar in 2022. Laila is also a contributing writer for the FT HTSI, where she writes a regular column called How To Host It. 

In 2022 Laila designed a homeware collection for esteemed Danish design company, HAY. The collection is titled Sobremesa and available at Hay locations worldwide, and online. She also created a capsule collection for Byredo in the same year. 

Laila is based in New York but works worldwide on location, most often in London, Paris, Milan and Venice.

WORK 

Gohar’s collaborators include: Prada, Hermès, Comme des Garçons, Perrier-Jouët, and Sotheby’s.

GOHAR WORLD 

Founded by sisters Laila & Nadia Gohar in 2020, Gohar World is a tableware universe that embraces craft, time, tradition, and humor. Created in family-owned ateliers to bring people together around the table, their surrealist tabletop objects tell a story of time.

References

External links
 Official website

1988 births
Egyptian expatriates in the United States
Living people
People from Cairo